Tulehu (also known as Souw Aman Teru) is an Austronesian language spoken on Ambon Island in eastern Indonesia, part of a dialect chain of Seram Island.

Tulehu is also the name of a village; each of the villages, Tulehu, Liang, Tengah-Tengah, and Tial, is said to have its own dialect.

Phonology 

Voiced stops can also be heard from loanwords.

References

Central Maluku languages
Languages of Indonesia
Seram Island